António Roquete may refer to:
 António Roquete (footballer)
 António Roquete (judoka)